Koti Chennaya is 2007 historical Tulu language film based on the lives of Koti and Chennayya, the twin cultural folk heroes of Tulu Nadu. The film, which combines history, folklore and social stratum of yesteryear Tulu Nadu, is directed by Anand P Raju, with R Dhanaraj serving as producer under the banner of Prarthana Creations. The film stars Balakrishna Shetty as Koti, Shekar Kotian as Chennaiah, Vinaya Prasad as Kinnidaru and Neethu as Deyi Baidithi in the lead roles.

The film has won the Indian National Award for Best Feature Film in Tulu at the 54th National Film Awards, and Karnataka State Film Award for Best Supporting Actress in 2007.

References

Films scored by V. Manohar